was a Japanese basketball player. He competed in the men's tournament at the 1964 Summer Olympics.

References

1943 births
2011 deaths
Japanese men's basketball players
Olympic basketball players of Japan
Basketball players at the 1964 Summer Olympics
Sportspeople from Gunma Prefecture